Jafarabad (also Romanized as Ja‘farābād) is a village in Quri Chay-ye Sharqi Rural District, in the Central District of Charuymaq County, East Azerbaijan Province, Iran. At the 2006 census, its population was 26, in 6 families.

References 

Populated places in Charuymaq County